Trioceros schoutedeni, Schouteden's montane dwarf chameleon, is a species of chameleon found in Rwanda and Democratic Republic of the Congo.

References

Trioceros
Reptiles described in 1952
Taxa named by Raymond Laurent
Reptiles of the Democratic Republic of the Congo